Aimone Calì (born 11 February 1997) is an Italian football player. He plays for Serie D club Montespaccato.

Club career
In his youth career he represented Roma and Lazio.

He made his professional Serie C debut for Carrarese on 18 September 2016 in a game against Cremonese.

From 2017 to 2019 he played in the fifth-tier Eccellenza league.

In July 2019 he was signed by Serie A club Atalanta, who then on 13 July 2019 loaned him to Catanzaro in Serie C for a two-year term with a purchase option.

On 8 August 2020 he signed a 3-year contract with Viterbese. The contract was terminated by mutual consent on 30 December 2020. He then returned to one of his previous club Montespaccato, which was promoted into Serie D.

References

External links
 

1997 births
Footballers from Rome
Living people
Italian footballers
Association football forwards
Carrarese Calcio players
S.S. Racing Club Roma players
Atalanta B.C. players
U.S. Catanzaro 1929 players
U.S. Viterbese 1908 players
Serie C players
Serie D players